Strana.ua is a pro-Russian online publication in Ukraine, opened on February 16, 2016, by Igor Guzhva. It has been sanctioned in Ukraine since August 2021, which evoked mixed sentiments from other parts of the media industry. In February 2022, clones of the site were blocked. The blocks are controversial, however, experts say that it is a particularly efficient way to block potential Trojan Horses in the face of the Russian information war against Ukraine.

History

On February 16, 2016,  announced the launch of the publication, of which he became the editor-in-chief. Earlier, some media outlets worked for Multimedia Invest Group (including journalists , who became deputy editor-in-chief, and Iskander Khisamov.

The publication's editorial policy was generally critical of Petro Poroshenko's rule.

On June 3, 2016, Guzhva and Kryukova hosted the program "Subjective Results of Friday" on the pro-Russian TV channel NewsOne, which belongs to MP Yevhen Murayev (a former member of the Party of Regions).

In January 2017, the site accused the Ukrainian authorities of plans to organize a provocation against the publication with the help of law enforcement agencies.

in 2017, hackers repeatedly breached employees' emails and gained access to the site's admin account. Judging by the email dumps, the leaders and journalists of Strana.ua cooperated with the Russian propaganda sites Ukraine, and were funded by the Russian Federation.

At the end of July 2020, a fake "interview" with Patriarch Bartholomew appeared on the publication's website, in which he allegedly said that "the Kyiv Patriarchate never existed." The official publication of the Ecumenical Patriarchate denied that Bartholomew had given any interviews.

On August 21, 2021, the decision of the National Security and Defense Council imposed sanctions on the publication, and all Ukrainian internet providers disabled access to the strana.ua site. After the imposition of sanctions on the publication and the closure of the strana.ua website, the publication moved to another URL, strana.news, and later some Ukrainian providers cut off access to the strana.news website.

Reaction of the Ministry of Internal Affairs
On June 22, 2017, police and prosecutors detained Guzhva and his assistant under Part 3 of Article 189 of the Criminal Code of Ukraine (extortion). According to Prosecutor General Yuriy Lutsenko, for not posting compromising information about Radical Party MP Dmytro Linko,  who reported blackmail to the police on March 31. Guzhva allegedly received $10,000.

Guzhva stated that he did not demand the money, but was offered it to remove the material. After he refused to take it, the money was allegedly thrown at him.

Anton Filipkovsky from Kharkiv was also detained, as a probable accomplice. Guzhva and Strana.ua call him a provocateur who was deliberately sent to the site's editor-in-chief to ask him to take money for removing the publication and fabricating the case.

Guzhva calls the publication of high-profile critical materials against Poroshenko the motive for opening a criminal case. In particular, the revelations of People's Deputy Oleksandr Onyschenko, who accused Poroshenko of total corruption.

Owner
In September 2017, Guzhva said that a total of five criminal cases had been fabricated against him. According to the head of the National Union of Journalists of Ukraine this suggests a selective approach of the authorities when criminal cases are initiated against the editor-in-chief of a particular publication.

In January 2018, Igor Guzhva sought political asylum in Austria due to pressure and threats from the authorities in Ukraine.

The case of searches was noted by international organizations as an example of the alarming situation with freedom of speech in Ukraine. The statement was made, in particular, by the committee to Protect the Rights of Journalists. The situation was included in the OSCE report on freedom of speech.

A number of media experts criticize the publication for its anti-Ukrainian position and express claims to the content and forms of its submission

Criticism and scandals

Critics of the site allege it maintains pro-Russian and anti-Ukrainian editorial policies, as well as a manipulative manner of presenting information:
lack of fact-checking, publishing hoaxes 
spreading Russian propaganda 
using pseudo experts
 emotionally colored headlines
 incorrect translation of foreign materials.

The site was accused of involvement in a pro-Russian news agency: in December 2016, under the guise of advertising, it published inaccurate information about a number of companies resuming trade with Russia.

Guzhva stated that the site published these materials allegedly with the label "advertising". Guzhva stated that the site published these materials labeled as "advertising". The publication was also exposed for posting jeans about Medvedchuk's activities.

On February 16, 2017, Kryukova was announced as the organizer of a master class within the School of Young Journalists, organized by the Future of Chernihiv Region Foundation. Her speech focused on how to create a successful online newspaper and become one of the leading Ukrainian media outlets in a year, sparking protests from local activists and the public, criticizing the resource for its pro-Russian and anti-Ukrainian stance. As a result, the journalist did not take part in the event. This event with the participation of Kryukova was held later.

In the Ukrainian anti-rating of news, according to the Institute of Mass Media and the portal Texty.org.ua, Strana.ua took 5th place out of 50. The monitoring revealed 84 reliable news, 12 news items containing unreliable sources, and 3 unreliable news items. Among these publications, 17 news items had manipulative headlines, and 17 news items contained manipulations with emotions. The analysis revealed one fake, as well as one piece of news that contained hate speech. The study was conducted within the project "Development of responsible online media" with the support of the Ministry of Foreign Affairs of the Czech Republic in June–August 2018.

In April 2020, IMI conducted an analysis of online media, noting that violations of professional standards were recorded on 32% of the material on the Strana website.

References

2016 establishments in Ukraine
2021 disestablishments in Ukraine
Internet properties established in 2016
Internet properties disestablished in 2021